Rocky Lane is a locality in northern Alberta, Canada surrounding the Boyer 164 Indian reserve of the Beaver First Nation.

Amenities 
The Rocky Lane area features the Rocky Lane Community Hall, completed and opened by the Rocky Lane Agricultural Society in 2011, and the Rocky Lane Nordic Ski Club, which features  of cross-country ski trails and equipment rentals. The Machesis Lake Provincial Recreation Area, located to the southwest of Rocky Lane, consists of a lake, day use sites, and overnight campsites.

References 

Communities on Indian reserves in Alberta